Natasha Baig, also spelled Nata-sha Baig is a Pakistani singer-songwriter from Hunza Valley. She sings in various genres including Sufi rock and had her latest hit with the Burushaski language song "Ya Maula" in collaboration with the designer Yousuf B. Qureshi.

Early life
Natasha Baig was born and raised in Karachi, but her family home is in Hunza.

Education
Natasha Baig is a Film and Television Production graduate from the Shaheed Zulfikar Ali Bhutto Institute of Science and Technology (SZABIST), Karachi. Baig first became interested in music as a hobby and then gave musical performances in local community events in Hunza.

Career
Baig has no formal music education. She grew up listening to Abida Parveen, Michael Jackson, and others. She is known for her live performances in Pakistan.

She started her career in 2013 with a reality show ‘Cornetto Music Icons’ where she was selected as one of the six finalists and was mentored by Zoe Viccaji. Her performance of the song ‘Dekha na tha’ by Alamgir was commended. After the show Baig joined ‘Sounds of Kolachi’ a Sufi ensemble originally started by Ahsan Bari where she was one of the main lead singers in the ensemble.

Baig was also one of the panelists in ‘The Karachi Music Festival’ alongside Humera Channa, Zoe Viccaji and Saif Samejo where they discussed the Pakistani music industry. She also performed in the event with her new band ‘Kaya’. Soon Baig left Kaya and started performing as a solo artist with her own band members including her brother Sameer Baig on guitars. She performed at "Lahooti Music Mela" introduced by Saif Samejo of Sketches band and many other musical events across the country.

In 2016, Baig co-founded a production Company ‘Laal Series’ that produced Baig’s music videos besides other work in the industry including commercials, short films and public service messages. The breakthrough for Baig came when she was nominated for Best Emerging Talent at the 2017 Lux Style Awards for her song "Jhoom Le" in the film Janaan. She then released her song with Mai Dhai "Kesaria". which was produced by her company Laal Series.

Baig then released her song "Maa" on Mother’s Day. Her latest song is "Deewana Banaya". She has appeared in Coke Studio Season 11, singing Shikwa/ Jawab-e-Shikawa, a poem by Allama Iqbal. The song was well received throughout the region and remained trending at top in Pakistan. 

Natasha Baig appeared in Kashan Admani's Acoustic Station and performed a rendition of "Dur Ze Darya" - written by the Persian poet Nasir Khusraw.

We Are One (Global Collaboration Song) 
Natasha Baig featured in We Are One (Global Collaboration Song) produced by Kashan Admani. The song features 40 musicians from all over the world coming together for a message of hope and togetherness.

Discography

Television OST's
Jhooti Produced by Shuja Haider
Naina aur Tum
Muhabbat Khak Safar
Kahani Raima Aur Manahil Ki produced by Sohail Haider
Sangsaar 
Khaas produced by Sohail Haider

Film Songs
"Jhoom le" Janaan (2016) Produced by Taha Malik
"Ishq Lara" Saat Din Mohabbat In (2017) Produced by Shani Arshad

Singles
Mane Na Kehna (Cornetto Music Icon) - 2013

Kesaria - 2017

Humse Hai Pakistan - 2017

Maa - 2017

Ya Moula - 2017

Deewana Banaya - 2017

Shikwa Jawab e Shikwa (CokeStudio Season 11) ft. Fareed Ayaz Qawal Group

Ek Qoum Ek Awaz (Audionic Azadi Anthem) - 2018

Bulleya Bulleya ft RaagRush 2018

Ho Mian - 2018

Ya Moula (Urdu) - 2019

Maine Dekha Hai - 23 March 2019 

Dur Ze Darya - Acoustic Station

Mushkil Kusha (Ayaz Ismail)

Kaise Kahoon (Ayaz Ismail, Hussain Ajani)

Awards and nominations

|-
! style="background:#bfd7ff" colspan="4"|Lux Style Awards
|-
|2017
|"Jhoom Le" – Janaan
|Emerging Talent of the Year
|
|-
|2020
|"Wo Jo Tha Bohat Hi Khaas" - Khaas
|Best Original Soundtrack (TV)
|
|}

References

External links

Living people
21st-century Pakistani actresses
Urdu-language singers
1992 births
People from Hunza
21st-century Pakistani women singers
Burusho people